The 15273 / 74 Raxaul–Anand Vihar Terminal Satyagrah Express is an Express train belonging to Indian Railways - East Central Railway zone and is one of two trains that run between Raxaul Junction & Anand Vihar Terminal in India. The other train is the Sadbhawna Express.

It operates as train number 15273 from Raxaul Junction to Anand Vihar Terminal and as train number 15274 in the reverse direction serving the states of Delhi, Uttar Pradesh & Bihar.

Satyagrah (/ˌsætɪəˈɡrɑːhɑː/; Sanskrit: सत्याग्रह satyāgraha), loosely translates as "insistence on truth" (satya "truth"; agraha "insistence") or soul force or truth force, is a particular philosophy and practice within the broader overall category generally known as nonviolent resistance or civil resistance. The term satyagraha was coined and developed by Mahatma Gandhi.

Coaches

The 15273 / 74 Raxaul–Anand Vihar Terminal Satyagrah Express has 3 AC First cum AC 2 tier, 8 AC 3 tier, 7 Sleeper Class, 4 General Unreserved & 2 SLR (Seating cum Luggage Rake) Coaches. It does not carry a pantry car .

As is customary with most train services in India, coach composition may be amended at the discretion of Indian Railways depending on demand.

Service

Routeing

The 15273 / 74 Raxaul–Anand Vihar Terminal Satyagrah Express runs from Raxaul Junction via , Gorakhpur Junction, Basti, Babhnan, Gonda Junction, Sitapur City, Shahjahanpur, Bareilly, Moradabad, Hapur, Ghaziabad to Anand Vihar Terminal.

Traction

The route is now fully electrified. A Tughlakabad Indian locomotive class WAP-7 hauls the train for its entire journey.

Operation

15273 Raxaul–Anand Vihar Terminal Satyagrah Express leaves Raxaul Junction on a daily basis at 09:05, reaching Anand Vihar Terminal the next day at 09:05.
15274 Anand Vihar Terminal–Raxaul Satyagrah Express leaves Anand Vihar Termina] on a daily basis at 05:25 PM, reaching Raxaul Junction the next day at 04:45 PM.

Incidents

 On 21 November 2010, fake currency was recovered from the train.
 On 31 January 2011, some passengers pelted stones at the train.
 On 11 June 2013, two GRP cops who were on escort duty looted the passengers.
 On 3 November 2013, a man was shot dead on board the train.
 On 21 May 2014, 63 children were rescued from child traffickers who used the train to transport them.

References

Sources

 http://concoction.in/IRFCA-Pure-High-Speed-Diesel-Action-Of-Satyagrah-Express-At-Kuchesar-Road-Station/hKaBev1IsmY.html#.U_rt_6MyJXs

External links

Transport in Raxaul
Transport in Delhi
Named passenger trains of India
Rail transport in Delhi
Rail transport in Uttar Pradesh
Rail transport in Bihar
Express trains in India